Ramudu Hulu (also known as Ramudu Ulu, Ramudu or Pa Ramudu) is a settlement in Sarawak, Malaysia.

Neighbouring settlements include:

References

Populated places in Sarawak